Bayasgalan Dulguun, better known under his stage name Magnolian is a Mongolian indie folk artist and singer-songwriter. He sings in both Mongolian and English and describes himself as a crooner.

On Spotify, Magnolian is the second most-streamed Mongolian artist after The Hu.

Biography 
Dulguun has been playing guitar since the age of twelve and began composing songs of his own when he was a teen. In 2014, he chose the stage name Magnolian (a pun based on the similarity of the words "Mongolia" and "magnolia") to avoid being confused with another Mongolian artist who had the same name, Dulguun.

Magnolian's career in music began in 2015 when he performed as the only solo act at Mongolia's largest music festival, Playtime. Soon after this performance he released his first EP Famous Men. 2016 marked Mangolian's first performance abroad, in South Korea. In 2017, he performed at the South by Southwest festival in Austin, Texas.

References 

21st-century Mongolian male singers